Robert Ndrenika (born 10 January 1942) is an Albanian actor and former politician. He was honored with the People's Artist of Albania award in 1988. He was active in films, but also in theater and television performing hundreds of leading and supporting roles.

Biography
Ndrenika studied at the Qemal Stafa High School, in Tirana, Albania.

Ndrenika has been a member of Parliament of Albania during 1992–1996, representing Democratic Party of Albania.

In 1998, Ndrenika was honoured with People's Artist of Albania decoration, becoming one of the few actors to have this decoration. In 2012, Ndrenika was decorated with Honor of Nation Order by president Bamir Topi for his contributions in Albanian cinematography.

Ndrenika has two daughters. His wife Polikseni Ndrenika, died in 2008. The loss of his wife kept Ndrenika away from acting for the next four years. He returned on stage in April 2012.

Filmography

 Kronikë provinciale (2009)
 Ne dhe Lenini - (2008)
 Tifozet - (2004) komedi
 Ishte koha për dashuri - (2004)
 Njerez dhe fate - (2002-2003) miniseri
 Tirana, viti zero - (2001) Kujtimi 
 Parullat - (2001) Lleshi
 Bolero - (1997) 
 Nata e dymbëdhjetë - teatër-komedi
 Botë e padukshme - (1987) Iliazi
 Përrallë Nga e Kaluara - (1987) Vangjeli
 Vrasje në gjueti - (1987) 
 Dhe vjen një ditë - (1986) Vëllai i Llano Bletës
 Gurët e shtëpisë sime - (1985) 
 Tre njerëz me guna - (1985) 
 Shirat e vjeshtës - (1984) 
 Kohë e largët - (1983) Anastas Grigori
 Besa e kuqe - (1982) 
 Era e ngrohtë e thellësive - (1982) (TV) 
 Nëntori i dytë - (1982) 
 Shi në plazh - (1982)
 Vëllezër dhe shokë - (1982) 
 Një shoqe nga fshati - (1980)
 Ditët që sollën pranverën - (1979) (TV) 
 Mësonjëtorja - (1979) Kosta
 Në shtëpinë tonë - (1979)
 Koncert në vitin 1936 (1978) Fotaqi (n/prefekti)
 Shëmbja e idhujve - (1977) Kapteri
 Emblema e dikurëshme - (1976) (TV) 
 Duke kërkuar 5-orëshin - (1974) Zeqo
 Rrugë të bardha - (1974)
 Shtigje të luftës - (1974) Shabani
 Kryengritje në pallat - (1972)
 Odiseja e tifozave - (1972) 
 Kapedani - (1972) i biri i xha Sulos
 I teti në bronx - (1970) Xhemali
 Horizonte të hapura - (1968) Azemi
 Oshëtimë në bregdet'' - (1966)

References

1942 births
Living people
20th-century Albanian male actors
People's Artists of Albania
People from Himara
21st-century Albanian male actors
Albanian male film actors
Albanian male television actors